Tereske is a village in Nógrád county, Hungary.

Etymology
The name is of Slavic origin - Trška, see also e.g. Trška Gora ("a vineyard hill") in Slovenia. 1205-1235 Abbas de losco Triskay (Triskai) mosanerio. The village was known in the past also as "Slovak Trška" (Totriske, Touttriske, Tot Tereske, Tottreske).

Parochial church 
The most attractive thing to see in the village is the church. The Tereske parochial church has been built as a Benedictine abbey in romanesque style in the 11th century AD. The main sightseeing is the legend of Saint László Ladislaus I of Hungary on a mural on the north wall of the nave. It consists of four characteristic stages: two armies before the battle, fighting of St. László and the cumanian prince, the execution and the resting of St. László. King Matthias Corvinus of Hungary donated the monastery to his servient, Bajoni István, who rebuilt the church. From this time a pastoforium can be seen. In the 16th century an extra wall was erected before the mural, and later the church was renovated in Baroque style.

References 

 Gerevich T.: Magyarország románkori emlékei. (Die romanische Denkmäler Ungarns.) Egyetemi nyomda. Budapest, 1938.
 Aradi N. (Ed.): A művészet története Magyarországon. (The History of Arts in Hungary). Gondolat, Budapest 
 Fülep L. (Ed.): A magyarországi művészet története. (The History of the Hungarian Arts). Budapest 
 Marosi E.: A román kor művészete, (Art of the Romanesque Ages). Corvina, Budapest, 1972,  
 Gerő L. : Magyar műemléki ABC. Budapest, 1984
 Henszlmann Imre: Magyarország ó-keresztyén, román és átmeneti stylü mű-emlékeinek rövid ismertetése, Királyi Magyar Egyetemi Nyomda, Budapest, 1876.
 Pogány Frigyes (1965): Szobrászat és festészet az építőművészetben. Műszaki, Budapest
 Bérczi Szaniszló, Bérczi Zsófia, Bérczi Katalin: Románkori templomkapuk: régi és új műveltség egymásrarétegződése a románkori templomok épületszobrászatában, kapukon és oszlopokon, TKTE, Piremon, 1997.
 Sena Sekulić-Gvozdanović (1994): Templom erődítések Horvátországban. Tankönyvkiadó, Zágráb. http://mars.elte.hu/varak/aahrtemplomvarak/hr%20templomvarak.htm

External links 
 Street map 

Tereske
Romanesque architecture in Hungary